Stob an Aonaich Mhoir (855 m) is a remote mountain in the Grampian Mountains of Scotland. It lies in Perthshire, on the eastern shore of Loch Ericht.

Due to its very remote location in the heart of the Grampians, a bicycle is recommended to reach the foot of the mountain, as the quickest route to it is from a private road from Loch Rannoch several miles to the south. The huge Ben Alder massif lies on the opposite side of Loch Ericht.

References

Marilyns of Scotland
Corbetts
Mountains and hills of Perth and Kinross